Enhancer may refer to:

 Enhancer (genetics), a short region of DNA that can increase transcription of a gene
 Exciter (effect), audio effect unit

See also
 
 Enhance (disambiguation)